The Oaș Mountains are a small volcanic mountain range within the Vihorlat-Gutin Area of the Inner Eastern Carpathians. The mountains are centered in northern section of the Oaș Country, covering border area between the Satu Mare County in Romania, and the Zakarpattia Oblast in Ukraine. They are an extension of the Gutin Mountains.

Its highest mountain is Peak Piatra Vâscului, reaching .

See also

 Oaș Country
 Romanian Carpathians
 Ukrainian Carpathians

References

Sources

External links
 Oaș Mountains on the northern section map of Satu Mare County

Mountain ranges of the Eastern Carpathians
Mountain ranges of Romania
Mountain ranges of Ukraine